Arianna Puello or Ari (Arianna Isabel Puello Pereyra) (born 16 January 1977 in San Pedro de Macorís, Dominican Republic) is a Spanish rapper of Dominican origin. Her single "Juana Kalamidad" reached number six on the Spanish Singles Chart.

She lived in Dominican Republic before moving to Salt, Girona (Girona, Catalonia, Spain) when she was 8 years old. She started out in the world of hip hop in 1993 when she recorded a song with a friend, and later joined a band with Bano known as N.O.Del KRIB (Nacidos Originalmente del Karibe). After they split up, she joined another band, Discípulos del Micro, but she had her first hit with a collaboration on El Meswy's first album, Mujer chunga. In 1998, she released her first solo album,  El tentempié .

Discography 

 1998: El tentempié (Zona Bruta)
 1999: Gancho perfecto (Zona Bruta)
 2001: La fecha (Zona Bruta)
 2003: Así lo siento (Zona Bruta)
 2008: 13 Razones (Zona Bruta)
 2010: Kombate o Muere (Zona Bruta)
 2015: Despierta (EnTuCuelloRecords, Zona Bruta)

Collaborations 

 1997: El Meswy Tesis Doctoral
 1999: El Imperio Monopolio
 1999: Frank T Nuevo ser
 2001: VKR En las calles
 2001: Hablando en Plata A sangre fría
 2001: Frank T 90 kilos
 2003: Zenit Producto infinito
 2004: Cartel de Santa La Plaga Del Rap
 2005: Full Nelson Confía en mí
 2005: BO de Bagdad Rap
 2006: Tiempo de kambio
 2014: C-Kan "Justicia"

References 

Living people
Spanish women rappers
Dominican Republic emigrants to Spain
People from San Pedro de Macorís Province
1977 births
Women in Latin music